Richard Gordon (born Gordon Stanley Benton, 15 September 1921 – 11 August 2017, also known as Gordon Stanley Ostlere), was an English ship's surgeon and anaesthetist. As Richard Gordon, Ostlere wrote numerous novels, screenplays for film and television and accounts of popular history, mostly dealing with the practice of medicine. He was best known for a long series of comic novels on a medical theme beginning with Doctor in the House, and the subsequent film, television, radio and stage adaptations. His The Alarming History of Medicine was published in 1993, and he followed this with The Alarming History of Sex.

Gordon was born in Paddington, London. He studied at Selwyn College, Cambridge, and worked as an anaesthetist at St. Bartholomew's Hospital (where he had been a medical student) and later as a ship's surgeon and as assistant editor of the British Medical Journal. He published several technical books under his own name, including Anaesthetics for Medical Students (1949), later published as Ostlere and Bryce-Smith's Anaesthetics for Medical Students in 1989; Anaesthetics and the Patient (1949), and Trichlorethylene Anaesthesia (1953).
He left medical practice in 1952, and took up writing full-time. The early Doctor novels, set in the fictitious St. Swithin's, a teaching hospital in London, were witty and apparently autobiographical; later books included more sexual innuendo and farce. The novels were successful in Britain in Penguin paperback during the 1960s and 1970s. Gordon also contributed articles to Punch magazine, and published books on medicine, gardening, fishing and cricket.

The film adaptation of Doctor in the House (1954) was released two years after the book's publication. He had an uncredited role as an anaesthetist in the film. Doctor at Sea came out the following year, with Brigitte Bardot in the cast. Dirk Bogarde starred as Dr. Simon Sparrow in both. The later spin-off TV series were written by British comedy writers. In 1974, he walked off the set of This is Your Life when Eamonn Andrews appeared with the red book. He later changed his mind and the show was transmitted a week later.

Gordon's wife Mary Ostlere was also a physician, and the couple had four children. He died on 11 August 2017.

Partial bibliography

Doctor in the House. London: Joseph, 1952
Doctor at Sea. London: Joseph, 1953
The Captain's Table. London: Joseph, 1954
Doctor at Large. London: Joseph, 1955
Doctor in Love. London. Joseph, 1957
Doctor and Son. London: Joseph, 1959
Doctor in Clover. London: Joseph, 1960
Doctor on Toast. London: Joseph, 1961
Doctor in the Swim. London: Joseph, 1962
The Summer of Sir Lancelot. Heinemann, 1963
Love and Sir Lancelot. Heinemann, 1965
Doctor on the Boil. Heinemann, 1970
Doctor on the Brain. Heinemann, 1972
Doctor in the Nude.  Heinemann, 1973
Doctor on the Job.  Heinemann, 1976
Doctor in the Nest. Heinemann, 1979
Doctor's Daughters. Heinemann, 1981
Doctor on the Ball. Hutchinson, 1985
Doctor in the Soup. Century, 1986
The Last of Sir Lancelot. Hale, 1999
Nuts in May. Heinemann, 1964
The Facemaker. Heinemann, 1967
Surgeon at Arms. Heinemann, 1968
The Facts of Life. Heinemann, 1969
The Medical Witness. Heinemann, 1971
The Sleep of Life.  Heinemann, 1975
The Invisible Victory. Heinemann, 1977
The Private Life of Florence Nightingale. Heinemann, 1978
The Private Life of Jack the Ripper. Heinemann, 1980
The Private Life of Doctor Crippen. Heinemann, 1981
Dr. Gordon's Casebook (diary). Severn House, 1982 
Great Medical Disasters, Hutchinson, 1983 
Great Medical Mysteries. Hutchinson, 1984 
The Bulldog and the Bear: A Play in Two Acts. Samuel French, 1984 
The Alarming History of Medicine, Sinclair-Stevenson, 1993 
The Literary Companion to Medicine: An Anthology of Prose and Poetry, Sinclair-Stevenson, 1993 
An Alarming History of Famous and Difficult Patients. St. Martin's Press, 1997

References

Richard Gordon at World Book online encyclopedia

External links

 BBC Guide to Comedy

1921 births
2017 deaths
20th-century English medical doctors
Alumni of Selwyn College, Cambridge
Alumni of the Medical College of St Bartholomew's Hospital
English anaesthetists
20th-century English novelists
English screenwriters
English male screenwriters
English male novelists
British medical writers
20th-century English male writers
People from Paddington